Biblical speculative fiction is speculative fiction that uses Christian themes and incorporates the Christian worldview. (It is thus distinct from speculations on the Bible and/or Christianity such as Dan Brown's The Da Vinci Code.) The difference between biblical speculative fiction and general Christian speculative fiction is that the Christian nature of the story is overt. This represents the tension in the Christian fiction community between those who prefer stories that reflect a Christian worldview without explicitly Christian references (such as The Lord of the Rings), and those who prefer the more overt Christian material usually found in the works of G. K. Chesterton and C.S. Lewis. Current examples of these views may be found in the explanatory page of Ray Gun Revival, a magazine that takes the non-explicit route, and the homepage blurb of the Lost Genre Guild, a group dedicated to explicitly Christian speculative fiction.

Development

Modern biblical speculative fiction may be divided into two phases, though to some extent this reflects American Evangelical tendencies, not those of the world in general.

The first phase is a science-adventure story where the characters are generally devout Christians. They act on guidance from God, but no overt or miraculous divine intervention occurs. Like many other early Evangelical novels, there is almost always a non-Christian character who eventually becomes born again as a result of a formulaic process for getting saved. The emphasis is biblical and doctrinal. Theoretically, one could strip out the Christian content and simply get a moral, ethical science-fiction story, though some characters' motivations would be affected. A good example of this phase is Bernard Palmer's Jim Dunlap series from the late sixties, which was almost a Christian answer to Tom Swift, Jr.: Dr. Brockton, a godly former missionary, becomes a brilliant scientist, winning his young associates (including Jim Dunlap) to Christ as he produces various high-tech marvels, such as the wingless plane and a space station.

The second phase can almost be summed up in a single name: Frank Peretti. These stories still have a biblical and doctrinal emphasis, but they also feature miraculous intervention. Unlike the first type mentioned above, they are inherently Christian and would implode if the Christian content were removed. The salvation formula is not rigidly followed: a character's salvation experience is often more of a process than a formula-based event.

The importance of Peretti is likely that he showed other writers what was possible: This Present Darkness unapologetically featured demons, angels, and a non-human perspective on spiritual warfare. Much modern biblical speculative fiction derives from Peretti's approach or at least responds to it.

On the other hand, writers outside the American Evangelical community have produced some "modern" works for decades. G. K. Chesterton's The Ball and the Cross, for example, has a science-fictional opening as critical of evolution as anything written today, provides a salvation without the usual "sinner's prayer", and toward the end features a miraculous divine intervention Peretti could have written. Likewise, C.S. Lewis' The Chronicles of Narnia are non-formulaic in their approach to salvation and overtly miraculous in content. The same is true of Lewis' Space Trilogy.

Current Venues

In the last few years, many new venues have opened for the Biblical, or Christian, Speculative Fiction genre. Jeff Gerke's Marcher Lord Press is an excellent example of this. MLP is an independent publishing house for CSF and has made a name for itself within the Christian publishing industry. Using Print on Demand (POD) technology, MLP has managed to usher in a new era for CSF and publishing in general. Other independent publishers have since followed this model such as Odyssey Illustrated Press, for instance, which came on the industry scene following encouragement from Gerke. The result has brought a broader range of CSF to this niche market, but has also answered the demand for more variety in the genre as well. Twelve House is a publisher also Christ-centered; more can be found via twelvehousebooks.wordpress.com

In addition to MLP, OIP, and other publishers, there are several Internet only venues referred as e-zines or web-zines. These include Mind Flights, Residential Aliens, and The Cross and the Cosmos just to name a few. These venues offer free CSF for the masses and enable the propagation of the genre. They include a variety of downloadable content, stories, and poetry.

The future?
A different view of the subgenre's development suggests that there is a trend toward increasing inclusion, just as evangelical Protestants in general seem to be opening up to other branches of Christianity. This view is based on stories from a recent anthology, Light at the Edge of Darkness, and on cooperation in the field in general, such as promotion of non-Protestant works by Protestant writers, and vice versa. OIP uses the model of distribution precedented by MLP, but publishes CSF that is more progressive in its approach to plot themes and character development. They are open to Christian readers and non-Christian readers alike. This growing approach to CSF is becoming more common place and is developing a 'New Wave' of CSF that is not unlike the movement in secular speculative fiction in the sixties, helmed by writers such as Michael Moorcock.

References

Further reading
 Dalton, Russell W. (2003). Faith Journey Through Fantasy Lands: A Christian Dialogue With Harry Potter, Star Wars, and the Lord of the Rings. Minneapolis: Augsburg Fortress Publishers. 160 pages. 
 May, Stephen (1998). Stardust and Ashes : Science Fiction in Christian Perspective. n.p.: Society for promoting Christian knowledge. 160 pages. 
 Palmer, Bernard (1968). Jim Dunlap and the Wingless Plane. Chicago: Moody Press.

External links
 Coach's Midnight Diner
 The Cross and the Cosmos
 The Lost Genre Guild
 The Lost Genre Guild blog
 Marcher Lord Press
 MindFlights Magazine
 Odyssey Illustrated Press
 Ray Gun Revival
 Residential Aliens
 Speculative Faith blog
 Splashdown Books
 Twelve House
 WhereTheMapEnds blog
 The Writers Cafe Press

 
Christian writers
Speculative fiction